Fabrizio Romano (born 21 February 1993) is an Italian football journalist. He has worked for Sky Sport Italy, and is regarded as one of the most well-informed and reliable sources for football transfer news.


Early and personal life 
Romano was born in Naples on 21 February 1993. He attended Università Cattolica del Sacro Cuore in Milan. Romano is a supporter of English club Watford F.C. He is multilingual, and can speak English, Spanish, Italian, and Portuguese.

Career 
Romano started writing about football at 16, while still studying in high school. His career as a football transfer journalist began when he was 18, after receiving inside information from an Italian agent in Barcelona regarding then FC Barcelona player Mauro Icardi. Since joining Sky Sport Italy at age 19, he has created and built contacts with clubs, agents and intermediaries all over Europe. Romano also works as a reporter for The Guardian and CBS Sports. He is based in Milan.

Romano is known for his use of the tagline "Here we go!", used when announcing a transfer deal. According to 90min, he is one of the "most trusted" transfer-related pundits in the sport. Because of his reputation and social media following, several football clubs have asked him to participate in player announcement videos.

References

External links 

 Profile on The Guardian
 Profile on CBS Sports
 Profile on CaughtOffside
 Fabrizio Romano's channel on YouTube
 
 Fabrizio Romano's Daily Briefing on Substack

1993 births
Living people
Journalists from Naples
Italian journalists
Sky Sports presenters and reporters
The Guardian journalists
Italian sports journalists
Association football journalists
CBS people
Università Cattolica del Sacro Cuore alumni